Vladimirea stepicola is a moth in the family Gelechiidae. It was described by Povolný in 1976. It is found in southern Iran.

The length of the forewings is 2.8-3.4 mm. The forewings are grey-brownish with three dots, which are variably ill-defined or well perceptible. At the apex, the scales are uniform grey or lighter with darker tips. The hindwings are dirty greyish-white.

References

Vladimirea
Moths described in 1976